Changting may refer to:

Changting County (长汀县), of Longyan, Fujian, China
Changting Prefecture (长汀), a territorial unit in the first half of the 20th century
Changting dialect

See also
 Changxing (disambiguation)
 Changxin (disambiguation)